The Alamo Area Council of Governments (AACOG) is a voluntary association of cities, counties and special districts in the south-central region of the U.S. state of Texas.

Based in San Antonio, the Alamo Area Council of Governments is a member of the Texas Association of Regional Councils.

Counties served
Atascosa
Bandera
Bexar
Comal
Frio
Gillespie
Guadalupe
Karnes
Kendall
Kerr
Medina
McMullen (since 2013)
Wilson

Largest cities in the region
San Antonio
New Braunfels
Schertz
Seguin
Kerrville
Universal City
Converse
Fredericksburg
Leon Valley
Live Oak
Pleasanton
Hondo

References

External links
Alamo Area Council of Governments - Official site.

Texas Association of Regional Councils